Warneford is a surname. Notable people with the surname include:

John Warneford (1720–1773), British clergyman and scholar
Reginald Warneford (1891–1915), Royal Naval Air Service officer
Samuel Wilson Warneford (1763–1855), British cleric and philanthropist